Kfar Chabad (lit. "Chabad Village") is a Chabad-Lubavitch village in central Israel. Between Beit Dagan and Lod, it falls under the jurisdiction of Sdot Dan Regional Council.

History

The site had previously been the  depopulated Palestinian  village of al-Safiriyya (known to the Byzantines and Crusaders as Sapharea or Saphyria). During the 16 century, Haseki sultan endowed al-Safiriyya to its Jerusalem soup kitchen. Under Ottoman rule, the area of Kfar Chabad belonged to the Nahiyeh (sub-district) of Lod that encompassed the area of the present-day city of Modi'in-Maccabim-Re'ut in the south to the present-day city of El'ad in the north, and from the foothills in the east, through the Lod Valley to the outskirts of Jaffa in the west. This area was home to thousands of inhabitants in about 20 villages, who had at their disposal tens of thousands of hectares of prime agricultural land.

Kfar Chabad was established in 1949 by Yosef Yitzchak Schneersohn.  As late as 1957 it was referred to in Hebrew as Tzafrir or Shafrir.

The first inhabitants were mostly recent immigrants from the Soviet Union, survivors of World War II and Stalinist oppression. Regarding their aliyah, the Jewish Observer reported: “There were several noteworthy aspect of this Aliyah. Chabad members refused all offers of help from religious and political organizations; they insisted on going on the land. Adapting themselves to modern agricultural methods ... To them it was a point of honor to live as they were taught. This meant subsisting only on what they earned by their own toil".

Kfar Chabad, which is just outside Lod and about 8 km southeast of Tel Aviv, includes agricultural lands as well as numerous educational institutions. It serves as the headquarters of the Chabad-Lubavitch Hasidic movement in Israel. Kfar Chabad is a Lubavitch community.

Replica of "770"
The village features a full-scale replica of "770", the world headquarters of Chabad at 770 Eastern Parkway, Crown Heights, Brooklyn, New York, which was built in 1896. The building, which serves as a synagogue, includes the exact same number of bricks as the original structure; the brickwork was produced by Teracotta Ofakim Clay Industries in Ofakim. The Lubavitcher Rebbe covered the US$700,000 building cost.

Railway station

Kfar Chabad has a railway station served by trains on the line between Binyamina and Ashkelon. It was built in 1952 and rebuilt in 1999.

Terror attack at the vocational school
 Vocational school in Kfar Chabad

On 11 April 1956, fedayeens entered the synagogue in a vocational school during evening prayers and started shooting indiscriminately. Five children and one teacher were killed, another ten injured.

Education
Kfar Chabad provides vocational training in printing, mechanics, carpentry, and agriculture for male students, and education for female students. The programs are combined with religious education. Most students, who come from outside the village, are not Hasidic.

Political leadership
Previous mayors include Shlomo Meidanchik and Menachem Lehrer. The current mayor is Nachmen Richman.

Religious leadership
The village rabbi was Mordechai Shmuel Ashkenazi from 1983 until his death in 2015. The previous rabbi was Shneur Zalman Gorelik, from the town's founding until his death.

See also

Kfar Habad Railway Station
Diamante citron

References

Chabad communities
Chabad in Israel
Orthodox Jewish communities
Populated places established in 1949
1949 establishments in Israel
Religious Israeli communities
Villages in Israel
Yosef Yitzchak Schneersohn
Populated places in Central District (Israel)